The Secret of Elena's Tomb is the EP follow up to Source Tags & Codes by Austin, TX band ...And You Will Know Us by the Trail of Dead. The title is inspired by the story of Carl Tanzler.

Track listing
"Mach Schau" – 3:49
"All St. Day" – 3:53
"Crowning of a Heart" – 3:30
"Counting Off the Days" – 3:11
"Intelligence" – 4:55

The enhanced section contains the videos of "Another Morning Stoner" and "Relative Ways" as well as a live video of "All St. Day".

References

External links
 

2003 EPs
...And You Will Know Us by the Trail of Dead albums
Interscope Records EPs